The Constitution provides for freedom of religion, and the Government generally respected this right in practice. There were no reports of societal abuses or discrimination based on religious belief or practice.

Religious demography

An estimated 70 percent of the country's citizens identify themselves as Christians. According to the 2001 census, the country's Muslim community, primarily of South Asian origin, numbers slightly more than 5,000. The 2001 census also lists approximately 3,000 Hindus and 700 of the Baháʼí Faith. Members of each community estimate that these figures significantly understated their respective numbers. Approximately 20 percent of citizens espouse no religion.

Status of religious freedom

Legal and policy framework
The Constitution provides for freedom of religion, and the Government generally respected this right in practice. The Government at all levels sought to protect this right in full and did not tolerate its abuse, either by governmental or private actors.

There is no state religion. Although it is common for government meetings to begin with a Christian prayer, members of other religious groups are not excluded from leading non-Christian prayers at such occasions. The Constitution also provides for the protection of the rights and freedoms of other persons, including the right to observe and practice any religion without the unsolicited intervention of members of any other religion.

All organizations, including religious groups, must register with the Government. To register, a group submits its constitution to the Registrar of Societies section of the Ministry of Labor and Home Affairs. The registration process takes 4 to 6 months to complete, on average. There are no legal benefits for registered organizations, although an organization must be registered before it can conduct business, sign contracts, or open an account in a local bank. Any person who holds an official position in, manages, or assists in the management of an unregistered organization is liable to a fine of up to $166 (Pula 1,000) and/or up to 7 years in prison. Any member of an unregistered society is liable to penalties including fines up to $83 (Pula 500) and/or up to three years in prison.

Sixty-nine religious groups registered from July 2006 to May 2007; however, during this same period 256 religious groups began the process of registration but had their applications terminated. The applications were automatically terminated after the failure to submit required forms, fees, or constitution within 90 days, as the law mandates. No religious organization was deregistered during the reporting period.

Religious education is part of the curriculum in public schools; it emphasizes Christianity but addresses other religious groups in the country. The Constitution provides that every religious community may establish places for religious instruction at the community's expense. The Constitution prohibits forced religious instruction, forced participation in religious ceremonies, or taking oaths that run counter to an individual's religious beliefs.

There are no laws against proselytizing.

Only Christian holy days are recognized as public holidays. These include Good Friday, Easter Monday, Ascension Day, and Christmas Day. However, members of other religious groups are allowed to commemorate their religious holidays without government interference.

Restrictions on religious freedom
Government policy and practice contributed to the generally free practice of religion.

The Constitution provides for the suspension of religious freedom in the interest of national defense, public safety, public order, public morality, or public health. However, any suspension of religious freedom by the Government must be deemed "reasonably justifiable in a democratic society."

There were no reports of religious prisoners or detainees in the country.

Forced religious conversion
There were no reports of forced religious conversion, including of minor U.S. citizens who had been abducted or illegally removed from the United States, or of the refusal to allow such citizens to be returned to the United States.

Societal attitudes and discrimination
During the reporting period, there were no indications of tension between the religious communities. Several religious groups were in the process of registering an official interfaith council which was expected to include representatives of Christian, Muslim, Hindu, and Baháʼí groups.

References
 United States Bureau of Democracy, Human Rights and Labor. Botswana: International Religious Freedom Report 2007. This article incorporates text from this source, which is in the public domain.

Botswana
Human rights in Botswana
Religion in Botswana